Hans Ulrich Engelmann (8 September 1921 in Darmstadt - 8 January 2011) was a German composer.

Biography 
Engelmann studied composition with Hermann Heiss and Wolfgang Fortner. He was a regular attendee of the Darmstadt International Summer Courses for New Music, and he was particularly affected by the twelve-tone classes of René Leibowitz (1948) and Ernst Krenek (1951), which helped him move from free atonality to serialism. Eventually, he would publish a history of the courses. In 1947, he began studying musicology with Gennrich Friedrich and Helmut Osthoff, earning a Ph.D in 1952. He also studied philosophy with Theodor Adorno, Max Horkheimer, Hans-Georg Gadamer.

A brief marriage took him to Iceland from 1953-4, before returning to Darmstadt to work as the music adviser and composer for the Hessisches Landestheater for the next seven years. His next post was in the same capacity at the Nationaltheater Mannheim, where his tenure lasted from 1961-9. He also held the same position one more time at the Städtische Bühnen in Bonn from 1972-3. In 1969, he began teaching at the Frankfurt Musikhochschule, and he remained on the faculty there for seventeen years.

In the early 60's, Engelmann began to incorporate techniques like electronic sound generation, graphic notation, jazz and collage into his music. By the end of the decade, he had assembled a pluralistic style which he showcased in large multimedia works such as Ophelia (1969). From 1974-9, he was largely occupied with revising his earlier work, before returning to smaller, less eclectic compositions.

A recipient of many scholarships and awards throughout his career, some of Engelmann's most notable honors include scholarships from Harvard and the Villa Massimo (1960, 1967, 1983), the Lidice Prize of Radio Prague (1960), the Stereo Prize of the German broadcasting industry (1969), the Johann Heinrich Merck Award (1971), the Goethe Medal (1986), the Order of the BRD (1991) and the Hessian Order pour le merite (1997).

Selected works 

Stage
Doctor Faust's Höllenfahrt, op.4, 1949–50
Magog, op.16, 1955–6
Noche da luna (pantomime for dancers), 1958
Der verlorene Schatten, op.22, 1960
Der Fall van Damm, op.30, 1966–7
Ophelia, op.36, 1969
Revue, op.43, 1972–3

Orchestra
Music for Strings, brass and percussion, 1948
Violin Concerto, 1948
Impromptu, 1949
Orchestral Fantasia, 1951
Partita, 1953
Strukturen, 1954
5 Pieces, 1956;
Polifonica, 1957;
Ezra Pound Music, 1959
Trias, 1962
Shadows, scenes, 1964
Sonata, op.32, 1967
Capricciosi, 1968
Sinfonies, 1968
Modelle II, 1970
Sinfonia da camera, 1981
Adagio et Aria, 1996
Concerto for percussion ensemble, 2001
Theatre Music, im memoriam Leonard Bernstein, 2002

Vocal 
Consolationes, chorus and strings, 1952
Elegia e canto, soprano, piano and strings, 1952
Komposition in 4 Teilen, soprano, flute, piano, and percussion 1953
Die Mauer, soprano, tenor, baritone, chorus and orchestra, 1954
Atlantische Ballade, alto, baritone, percussion trio, and strings, 1955
Nocturnos, soprano, orchestra, 1958
Incanto, soprano, saxophone, and percussion ensemble, 1959
Eidophonie, chorus, percussion, 1962
Commedia humana, speaker, double chorus, cello and tape 1972
Missa Popularis, chorus and orchestra, 1980
Les chansons, soprano, flute, clarinet, viola, cello and piano 1982
Stele für Büchner, alto, baritone, chorus and orchestra, 1986–7
Omnia tempus habent, chorus, 1996

Chamber
Jazz-Sonatine, piano, 1945
Piano music, 1945
Toccata, piano, 1947
Cello Sonata, 1948
Piano Suite no.1, 1948–50
Olaf’s Blues, guitar and piano 1949
2 Piano Pieces, 1950
Piano Suite no.2, 1952
String Quartet, 1952
Integrales, alto saxophone and piano, 1954
Permutazioni, flute, oboe, clarinet and bassoon, 1959
Variante, flute 1959
Cadenza, piano and tape 1961
Timbres, harp, celeste, piano, percussion quartet and tape, 1963
Mobile I ‘Fragmente’, piano and synthesizer 1967–71
Mobile II, clarinet and piano, 1968
mini-music to siegfried palm, op.38, cello, 1970
Modelle I oder ‘I love you Bäbi’, chamber ensemble, 1970
Klangstück, violin and piano, 1974
Divertimento, piano duo, 1980
Assonanzen, cello duo, 1983
Epitaph fü einen imaginären Freund, trumpet and piano, 1983
Inter-Lineas, alto saxophone, clarinet and percussion a sax, 1985
Dialoge, piano and percussion 1986–90
Clarinota, clarinet, 1991
Tastenstück, piano, 1991–3
Essay, organ, 1992
Ciacona, flute, bass clarinet, vibraphone, piano, violin, viola, and cello 1993
Modus, bassoon, 1993
Memoires à René Leibowitz, guitar, 1994–7
Black Invocations, saxophone, trumpet, trombone, percussion, piano and double bass, 1995
per Luigi, flute, clarinet, cello, percussion and tape, 1996
Jazz-Capriccio, piano 2001

Notable pupils 
 Gerhard Müller-Hornbach (born 1951)
 Hans-Jürgen von Bose (born 1953)
 Adrian Oswalt (born 1954)
 Claus Kühnl (born 1957)
 Wolfgang Kleber (born 1958)
 Ralf Emig (born 1959)
 Rolf Rudin (born 1961)
 Karl-Wieland Short (born 1961)

Writings 
Béla Bartóks ‘Mikrokosmos’: Versuch einer Typologie ‘Neuer Musik’ (diss., U. of Frankfurt, 1952; Würzburg, 1953/R)
‘Fragen serieller Kompositionsverfahren’, Gesellschaft für Musikforschung: Kongress-Bericht: Kassel 1962, 374–9
‘Rhythmus und bildnerisches Denken’, Melos, ix (1968), 261–7
‘Selbstgespräch über die Funkoper’, Melos, xi (1968), 418–23
‘Erfahrungen mit Kompositionsschülern’, Melos, xvi (1974), 347–9
‘Zur Genesis der Darmstädter Schule’, 50 Jahre Ferienkurse, ed. Internationales Musikinstitut Darmstadt (Darmstadt, 1996), 50–54

References

Further reading
U. Stürzbecher, U. Dibelius, C. Kühnl and others: Commedia humana. Hans Ulrich Engelmann und sein Werk (Wiesbaden, 1985)
W. Knauer: ‘Hans Ulrich Engelmann und der Jazz: ein Dialog’, Jazz und Komposition: Beiträge zur Jazzforschung (Hofheim, 1993), 27–3
H. Rohm: ‘Über Hans Ulrich Engelmann’, Werkverzeichnis Hans Ulrich Engelmann (Wiesbaden, 1996), 4–5 [Breitkopf & Härtel catalogue]
G. Borio and H. Danuser: Im Zenit der Moderne (Freiburg, 1997)

20th-century classical composers
21st-century classical composers
German classical composers
1921 births
2011 deaths
Musicians from Darmstadt
German male classical composers
20th-century German composers
21st-century German composers
20th-century German male musicians
21st-century German male musicians